The 2nd Critics' Choice Movie Awards were presented on January 20, 1997, honoring the finest achievements of 1996 filmmaking.

Top 10 films
(in alphabetical order)

 Big Night
 The Crucible
 The English Patient
 Evita
 Fargo
 Hamlet
 Jerry Maguire
 Lone Star
 The People vs. Larry Flynt
 Shine

Winners

 Best Actor:
 Geoffrey Rush – Shine
 Best Actress:
 Frances McDormand – Fargo
 Best Child Performance:
 Jonathan Lipnicki – Jerry Maguire
 Best Director:
 Anthony Minghella – The English Patient
 Best Documentary:
 When We Were Kings
 Best Family Film:
 Fly Away Home
 Best Foreign Language Film:
 Ridicule • France
 Best Picture:
 Fargo
 Best Screenplay:
 The English Patient – Anthony Minghella
 Best Supporting Actor:
 Cuba Gooding Jr. – Jerry Maguire
 Best Supporting Actress:
 Joan Allen – The Crucible
 Breakout Artist of the Year:
 Renée Zellweger – Jerry Maguire
 Lifetime Achievement Award:
 Lauren Bacall

References

Broadcast Film Critics Association Awards
1996 film awards